Meike Babel (born 22 November 1974) is a former tennis player from Germany. She was women's tennis assistant coach at Tulane University and at Vanderbilt University. In her ten years on the WTA Tour, she ranked 27 in singles and 45 in doubles.

WTA career finals

Singles (3 runner-ups)

Doubles (1 title, 2 runner-ups)

ITF Circuit finals

Singles (2–1)

Doubles (2–3)

References

External links
 
 
 
 

German female tennis players
1974 births
Living people
People from Offenbach (district)
Sportspeople from Darmstadt (region)
Tennis people from Hesse